Symboli Kris S (foaled January 21, 1999 in the United States  – December 8, 2020) was a retired Japanese Thoroughbred race horse. He was voted Japanese Horse of the Year in 2002 and 2003. He was retired at the end of 2003 and was syndicated for $15-million.

Major win and Placed race

3YO (2002) 
Japanese Horse of the Year
JRA Award for Best Three-Year-Old Colt

win
Tenno Sho (Autumn) (JRA-G1, turf 2000m)
Arima Kinen (JRA-G1, turf 2500m)
Aoba Sho (JRA-G2, turf 2400m)
Kobe Shimbun Hai (JRA-G2, turf 2000m)

placed
2nd - Japanese Derby (JRA-G1, turf 2400m)
3rd - Japan Cup (G1, turf 2200m)

4YO (2003) 
Japanese Horse of the Year
JRA Award for Best Older Male Horse

win
Tenno Sho (Autumn) (JRA-G1, turf 2000m) TR(1:58.0)
Arima Kinen (JRA-G1, turf 2500m) TR(2:30.5)

placed
3rd - Japan Cup (G1, turf 2400m)
5th - Takarazuka Kinen (G1, turf 2200m)

Stud record
Symboli Kris S first stood at the Shadai Stallion Station in Abira, Hokkaido.

At 2016, He moved to the Breeders Stallion Station in Hidaka, Hokkaido.

At October 2019, He retired from stud and was moved to the Symboli Farm in Narita, Chiba.

Progeny
 Success Brocken (2005) winner of the Japan Dirt Derby (Jpn-I) in 2008, February Stakes (JPN-GI) in 2009, and Tokyo Daishoten (Jpn-I) in 2009.
 Strong Return (2006) winner of the Yasuda Kinen (JPN-GI) in 2012.
 Alfredo (2009) winner of the Asahi Hai Futurity Stakes (JPN-GI) in 2011.
 Epiphaneia (2010), winner of the Kikuka Sho and the Japan Cup; sired Daring Tact and Efforia
 Le Vent Se Leve (2015), winner of the Zen-Nippon Nisai Yushun in 2017, as well as the Japan Dirt Derby in 2018, Mile Championship Nambu Hai in 2018, and the Champions Cup in 2018.

Symboli Kris S is also the damsire of Oju Chosan, Rey de Oro, Akai Ito, and Songline.

Pedigree

See also
List of leading Thoroughbred racehorses

References

Pedigree for Symboli Kris S
Thoroughbred Times

1999 racehorse births
2020 racehorse deaths
Racehorses bred in Kentucky
Racehorses trained in Japan
Japanese Thoroughbred Horse of the Year
Thoroughbred family 8-h